Janete Mayal (born 19 July 1963) is a Brazilian long-distance runner. She competed in the women's marathon at the 1992 Summer Olympics.

References

External links
 

1963 births
Living people
Athletes (track and field) at the 1992 Summer Olympics
Brazilian female long-distance runners
Brazilian female marathon runners
Olympic athletes of Brazil
Place of birth missing (living people)